Deryl Dodd is the second studio album by the American country music artist of the same name. It was released on November 24, 1998 via Columbia Nashville. The album includes the singles "A Bitter End", "Good Idea Tomorrow" and "John Roland Wood".

Critical reception
Jana Pendragon of AllMusic praised the album for having a more neotraditional country sound than his first album.

Track listing

Chart performance

References

1999 albums
Deryl Dodd albums
Albums produced by Blake Chancey
Columbia Records albums